Metropolitan FA is a Puerto Rican association football club from the capital of San Juan that currently plays in the Liga Puerto Rico. The club plays its home matches at the Parque Reparto Metropolitano.

History
Metropolitan FA was founded in 2012 by Argentine Jorge Silvetti. In 2015 the team finished third in the Copa Excelencia which took place that year in lieu of a Puerto Rico Soccer League season. By the 2016 season the club was competing in the resurrected Puerto Rico Soccer League, the top tier of football on the island. After finishing in second place during both halves of the regular season, the team had the most combined points in the league and advanced directly to the final. The club won the league championship in the playoff by defeating Bayamón FC in the final at the Juan Ramón Loubriel Stadium.

As part of pre-season preparations in 2017 Metropolitan FA competed in the annual Don Bosco Cup. The team won the silver medal in the tournament, falling 0–3 to GPS Puerto Rico in the final. The club finished the abbreviated 2017 regular season in third place before being eliminated in the playoff round. The league ceased operations following the season and Puerto Rico was without a top-tier competition until September 2018.

Metropolitan FA joined the nascent Liga Puerto Rico for its inaugural season in 2018/19. It went on to finish as the first-ever champions of the 8-team league. The club also finished runner-up in the Copa Luis Villarejo that season. The club began the 2019/20 campaign and was in a close second in the table but the season was eventually abandoned because of the COVID-19 pandemic and no champion was named. As reigning Puerto Rico champions, the club earned the right to compete in the 2020 Caribbean Club Shield. However, the tournament was also eventually cancelled because of the pandemic.

In August 2020 the club announced the signing of all-time leading scorer for the Puerto Rico national team Hector Ramos.  Because no 2020/21 season was held in Puerto Rico, Metropolitan FA was still the nation's reigning champion, thus qualifying the team for an expanded 2021 Caribbean Club Championship which kicked off in May 2021. In preparation for the tournament, the club played two friendly matches against San Cristóbal FC of the Primera División de Republica Dominicana at the Félix Sánchez Olympic Stadium in March 2021. Metropolitan FA lost the first match 0–3. In the second match, the Puerto Rican side earned a 1–1 draw with Hector Ramos scoring Metropolitan's first-ever goal against an international opponent.

Metropolitan opened its 2021 Caribbean Club Championship with a match against Delfines del Este FC on May 15. Metropolitan took the lead through a goal by Jorge Rivera in the 83rd minute but Delfines del Este leveled the score in the fifth minute of stoppage time. The match ended in a 1–1 draw. Two days later, Metropolitan earned its first win in international competition with a 4–0 victory over Bonaire champions SV Real Rincon. Hector Ramos opened the scoring with the eventual game-winner in the sixth minute while Jorge Rivera scored twice more. Real Rincon had previously won the bronze medal in the 2018 edition of the tournament. On the final matchday of the group stage, Delfines del Este defeated Real Rincon 10–0 and jumped ahead of Metropolitan at the top of the group on goal differential. However, CONCACAF ruled that Delfines fielded six ineligible players in its match against Metropolitan. As a result, Metropolitan was awarded a win for its match against Delfines, with the Puerto Rican club moving on to the semi-finals as a result. In the semi-final match, Metropolitan and Inter Moengotapoe of Suriname played an intense, but scoreless first half. Inter Moengotapoe broke the deadlock in the 53rd minute and went on to win 3–1 with Metropolitan's goal coming from Marc Nieves in the 95th minute. 

By advancing the semi-finals, Metropolitan FA secured a place in the preliminary round of the 2021 CONCACAF League, becoming the first-ever team from Puerto Rico to qualify for the tournament. On 16 June 2021 it was determined by draw that Metropolitan FA would face FC Santa Lucía Cotzumalguapa of Guatemala in the Preliminary Round. In preparation for the series, the club signed former French youth international Jordan Barbara and Puerto Rican striker Ricardo Rivera.

Stadium
Parque Reparto Metropolitano: 2015–present

Current squad
As of the June 24, 2021

Records

2015–2017
Key

2018-present

International competition
The following is a list of results for Metropolitan FA in international competitions. Metropolitan FA's scores are listed first.

Achievements

Puerto Rico Soccer League
Season Champions: 2016
Playoff Champions: 2016

Liga Puerto Rico
Season Champions: 2018-19,  2022

Copa Luis Villarejo
Runner-up: 2019

Copa Don Bosco
Runner-up: 2017

References

External links
Official Website

Liga Nacional de Fútbol de Puerto Rico teams
Sports in San Juan, Puerto Rico
Football clubs in Puerto Rico
Puerto Rico Soccer League teams
2012 establishments in Puerto Rico
Association football clubs established in 2012